Severance is an American science fiction psychological thriller television series created by Dan Erickson and directed by Ben Stiller and Aoife McArdle. It stars Adam Scott, Zach Cherry, Britt Lower, Tramell Tillman, Jen Tullock, Dichen Lachman, Michael Chernus, John Turturro, Christopher Walken, and Patricia Arquette. The plot follows Mark (Scott), an employee of Lumon Industries who agrees to a "severance" program in which his non-work memories are separated from his work memories.

The series premiered on Apple TV+ on February 18, 2022. It received acclaim from critics and audiences, who praised its cinematography, direction, production design, musical score, story, and performances (especially Scott). The series received 14 nominations at the 74th Primetime Emmy Awards including Outstanding Drama Series and acting nods for Scott, Turturro, Walken, and Arquette (winning for Main Title Design and score). In April 2022, the series was renewed for a second season.

Premise
A biotechnology corporation, Lumon Industries, uses a mindwipe medical procedure called "severance" to separate the consciousness of their employees between their lives at work and outside of it. Due to their increasingly divergent life experiences, the consciousnesses of the employees in the work place (dubbed "innies") gradually split from their consciousnesses outside of it (dubbed "outies"), to the point that they become distinct personalities with their own agendas. One severed employee, Mark (Adam Scott), gradually uncovers a web of conspiracy at Lumon, and the mysterious project the employees are unknowingly working on.

Cast and characters

Main
 Adam Scott as Mark S., a worker for Lumon Industries in the Macrodata Refinement division who is part of the "severance" program, whose "outie", Mark Scout, is grieving the death of his wife Gemma.
 Zach Cherry as Dylan G., Mark's severed co-worker who particularly enjoys company perks.
 Britt Lower as Helly R., a new employee who replaces Petey, much to her chagrin. 
 Tramell Tillman as Seth Milchick, the supervisor on the severed floor.
 Jen Tullock as Devon Hale, Mark's pregnant sister, who later gives birth to baby Eleanor.
 Dichen Lachman as Ms. Casey, the wellness counselor on the severed floor.
 Michael Chernus as Ricken Hale, Devon's husband and Mark's brother-in-law, a self-help author, whose book is left on the severed floor by Milchick.
 John Turturro as Irving Bailiff, Mark's severed co-worker who is a stickler for company policy and is drawn to Burt.
 Christopher Walken as Burt Goodman, the severed chief of the Optics and Design division who is drawn to Irving.
 Patricia Arquette as Harmony Cobel, Mark's unsevered boss, who outside of work goes undercover as Mrs. Selvig, Mark's next-door neighbor.

Recurring
 Yul Vazquez as Peter "Petey" Kilmer, an ex-severed Lumon worker and Mark's best friend who was fired under mysterious circumstances.
 Michael Cumpsty as Doug Graner, the head of security on Lumon's severed floor.
 Nikki M. James as Alexa, Devon's midwife.
 Sydney Cole Alexander as Natalie, Lumon's PR representative and liaison for its board of trustees.
 Nora Dale as Gabby Arteta, a new mother married to Senator Angelo Arteta. She underwent severance to avoid the pain of childbirth.
 Claudia Robinson as Felicia, Optics employee at Lumon.
 Mark Kenneth Smaltz as Judd, security guard at Lumon.

Guest
 Marc Geller as Kier Eagan, the founder of Lumon Industries, who is worshipped with cult-like devotion within the company. Despite his death, he is represented though sculptures, paintings, and recordings.
 Michael Siberry as Jame Eagan, the current CEO of Lumon Industries.
 Joanne Kelly as Nina, Petey's ex-wife.
 Cassidy Layton as June, Petey's daughter.
 Ethan Flower as Angelo Arteta, a Lumon-backed state senator who supports legalizing the Severance procedure and is married to Gabby Arteta, with whom he has three children.
 Karen Aldridge as Reghabi, a former Lumon surgeon who reintegrated Petey.

Ben Stiller has an uncredited voice cameo as an animated version of Kier Eagan.

Episodes

Production

Background 
While studying English at Western Washington University, Erickson became interested in the theater department, writing short plays and other creative works. Soon after, Erickson attended New York University, where he got a masters degree in television writing. In 2016, his screenplay for the pilot of Severance appeared on Blood List's survey results of the best unproduced genre screenplays. Erickson had worked in an office job before writing the show, stating in an interview, "The initial ideas came to me while I was working a really bad office job and going through a somewhat depressive state." Erickson is close with his siblings, stating they were inspirations for some of the characters on the show.

Development

Ben Stiller first read the screenplay to the pilot episode at least five years before the show premiered, calling it "the longest thing I've ever worked on." The script was submitted by Dan Erickson as a writing sample to Stiller's production company Red Hour Productions, and passed to Stiller by development executive Jackie Cohn. Stiller said he enjoyed the story's contributions to the workplace comedy. In January 2017, Stiller invited Adam Scott to star. In November 2019, Apple TV+ gave Severance a series order, with Stiller directing and Scott cast in the leading role. Stiller was only attached to direct the pilot but he decided to direct several more episodes as the series entered development.

On April 6, 2022, Apple renewed the series for a second season.

Filming

The COVID-19 pandemic postponed the initial production start of March 2020. Principal photography for the first season started in New York City under the working title Tumwater on November 8, 2020, the day after the U.S. presidential election. The opening scene of the show was shot on January 6, 2021. The series filmed for a few days in Nyack in February and in Kingston and Beacon in March. In April, filming moved to central New Jersey, mainly in the Bell Labs Holmdel Complex which stood in for Lumon HQ. Filming was scheduled to conclude on June 23, 2021. Production designer Jeremy Hindle blended corporate looks from the 1960s, 1970s, and 1980s for the show's distinctive look, and cited modernist architect Eero Saarinen as influential for the building design. Stiller said the prop master reconstructed old computers so the actors could actually do the work presented on the show in order to get adjusted to the office setting. These computers lacked an escape key, as a metaphor for the lack of control the Innies have while in Lumon's offices.

The second season began filming on October 3, 2022, in New York City, and is set to wrap on May 12, 2023. The second season will also shoot in New Jersey.

Casting 
In January 2020, Patricia Arquette, Britt Lower, Jen Tullock, and Zach Cherry were added to the cast. Tramell Tillman joined in February 2020, and John Turturro and Christopher Walken were added in November 2020. Dichen Lachman was cast in December 2020. Turturro said he recommended Walken for the role of Burt because he had known him for "a long time and I don't have to really act like we're friends." 

On October 31, 2022, Gwendoline Christie, Bob Balaban, Merritt Wever, Alia Shawkat, Robby Benson, Stefano Carannante, Ólafur Darri Ólafsson and John Noble were announced to have joined the cast for season two.

Influences
Modern media that influenced Severance include the online urban legend known as The Backrooms, the video game The Stanley Parable, films including Office Space, Brazil, The Truman Show, and Eternal Sunshine of the Spotless Mind, and the Dilbert comic strips. Older influences include the existential hell in the Jean-Paul Sartre play No Exit and the totalitarian dystopia in the George Orwell novel Nineteen Eighty-Four. Aesthetically, the series was influenced by the films Brazil, Dark City, Playtime, and other films by Terry Gilliam.

Reception

Critical response 
Severance was met with critical acclaim upon its release.  Metacritic, which uses a weighted average, assigned a score of 83 out of 100 based on 36 critics, indicating "universal acclaim".

The series received a rating of 5 out of 5 stars from Lucy Mangan of The Guardian and Rachael Sigee of I, 4 out of 5 stars from Huw Fullerton of Radio Times, John Nugent of Empire, Alan Sepinwall of Rolling Stone and Anita Singh of The Telegraph, and 3.5 out of 4 stars from Patrick Ryan of USA Today. In her review, Mangan praised Stiller's direction, the writing, and the performances of the cast (particularly that of Arquette, Turturro, Walken and Tillman). Sigee also praised the performances, especially Scott's, Arquette's, Turturro's and Walken's, and wrote, "Severance moves slowly but surely, allowing time to absorb both the impressive world-building and stunning visuals, [...] [and] its breathtaking cinematography and design. With an exceptional cast [...], this is an original, weird, thought-provoking and beautifully crafted story that asks just how much of ourselves we should give over to our jobs." Fullerton also praised Scott's performance and called the series "an impressive creation." Nugent praised the direction, performances of Scott, Arquette, Turturro and Walken, and chemistry between the latter two. Sepinwall also praised Stiller's direction and the cast's performances (most notably that of Scott, Turturro, Walken, Lower and Tillman), in addition to the production design, tone, and season finale.

Grading the series with an "A", Carly Lane of Collider stated that "the most engrossing element of Severance is the many mysteries it presents, wrapped up in silent overarching questions of philosophy, morality, and free will versus choice, and as the series demonstrates, some of those questions aren't so easily solved, but some issues aren't as black-and-white as initially presented either." Also grading it with an "A", Ben Travers of IndieWire said, "Whether you invest in the allegory, character arcs, or both, 'Severance' hits its marks. [...] Erickson and his writing staff deserve a ton of credit. The season plays out cleanly and efficiently; episodes range from nearly 60 minutes to a crisp 40; cliffhangers abound, but they’re earned. [...] This is serialized storytelling that knows how to make the most of its episodic format." Stephen Robinson of The A.V. Club gave it an "A-" grade and praised Stiller's direction and the cast, with the performances of Lower, Scott, Tillman, Turturro, Walken, Tullock and Cherry being singled out. From Entertainment Weekly, Kristen Baldwin graded it with a "B+" and highlighted the performances of Scott, Lower and Tillman, saying that "Scott is a superb fit for Severance's central everyman, [...] Lower brings an effective vulnerability to the acerbic Helly, and Tramell Tillman is an absolute force of charisma as Milchick."

Giving the series an "amazing" score of 9 out of 10, Samantha Nelson of IGN wrote in her verdict, "Severance [...] uses a clever premise and excellent cast to set up an intriguing mystery that leaves plenty of room for the characters to evolve." Writing for Paste, Shane Ryan gave it an 8.1 out of 10 and praised the performances of Scott, Arquette and Tillman as well as Stiller and McArdle's direction. Kyle Mullin of Under the Radar gave it an 8 out of 10 and said, "Severance's writer/creator Dan Erickson is another newcomer who pens scenes with veteran-level aplomb. Every scene is a Golden Age of TV gem in its own right. But Severance's dramatic heart resides at the workplace, where it also becomes a white-knuckle thriller. This is where director Ben Stiller especially shines, training his lens and setting the scenes [...]. He certainly brings the best out of his cast."

The American Film Institute named it one of the ten best television programs of the year.

Critics' top ten list

Accolades 

The first season was recognized with The ReFrame Stamp for hiring people of underrepresented gender identities, and of color.

Marketing
The second season was teased during the Apple Event that took place on September 7, 2022, which featured Helly (Britt Lower).

See also 
 Severance, a 2018 corporate dystopian novel by Ling Ma
 Cypher, a 2002 thriller with similar themes of memory erasure and separate identities in a mysterious workplace setting
 Drug-induced amnesia § In popular culture
 Greg Egan, a science fiction author known for writings about consciousness, and whose surname may be referenced in Severance
 Mind control in popular culture
 My Own Worst Enemy, a 2008 TV series about a secret agent and his cover, who has no knowledge of his own double life
 Paycheck, a 1952 novelette by Philip K. Dick, that explores a theme of erasing memory of the time spent on a contract

Notes

References

External links
 
 

2022 American television series debuts
2020s American mystery television series
2020s American workplace drama television series
2020s American science fiction television series
2020s American LGBT-related drama television series
American thriller television series
English-language television shows
Fiction about memory erasure and alteration
LGBT speculative fiction television series
Apple TV+ original programming
Television series about artificial intelligence
Television shows filmed in New York (state)
Television shows filmed in New Jersey
Television series by Red Hour Productions
Primetime Emmy Award-winning television series
Psychological thriller television series